The , also known as Peluso, is an outdoor bronze sculpture installed along Insurgentes Sur Avenue, in the southern borough of Tlalpan, in Mexico City. The statue was unveiled in July 2008 and was dedicated to the free-ranging dogs of the city.

It was sculpted by Girasol Botello and its model was Peluso, a former stray dog that was adopted by Patricia España, founder of Milagros Caninos, a non-governmental dog shelter. The shelter collected money and paid for the sculpture in order to raise awareness about the large population of free-ranging dogs in the city. Since its establishment, the monument has been neglected, vandalized and defaced.

Description
The Monumento al perro callejero depicts Peluso, a sad-looking and severely underweight stray dog, thin to the bones, with his tail between his legs and one injured hind leg. The sculpture was created by Patricia España (née Ruiz), founder of Milagros Caninos, a non-governmental dog shelter. It was sculpted by Girasol Botello and it was cast by Germán Michel. It cost Mex$130,000 and Milagros Caninos paid it with the contributions of private donations in order to raise awareness about the high population of free-ranging dogs in the city.

When it was inaugurated, the monument featured a plaque that said:

Jorge Castro said for Local.mx that the plaque symbolizes what stray dogs would say if they could talk.

Peluso, the dog
Peluso was the name given to a 15-year-old stray dog that España adopted. He had suffered abuse that left him with renal insufficiency, canine distemper, and deafness. Peluso died five days before the inauguration of the monument.

Installation and status
The Monumento al perro callejero was unveiled on 20 July 2008. It lies in the corner of Insurgentes Sur Avenue and Moneda Street, near the National Institute of Neurology and Neurosurgery, and between Ayuntamiento and Fuentes Brotantes Metrobús stations, in the center of Tlalpan, the southern borough of Mexico City. 

Since it was inaugurated, the monument has been neglected: it has been graffitied and its plaque was stolen. A well-preserved replica is kept at the Milagros Caninos dog shelter. Castro criticized the status of the monument, adding that it is ironic as its main purpose was to denounce the abandonment of stray dogs.

Reception
Castro said the statue is one of the most needed because it does not glorify a historical figure as most do, but instead "belittles the human who doesn't do anything to help". A writer of Chilango said that it celebrates a dying dog and only generates morbid fascination for the millions of stray animals that exist and ironized that as a consequence a monument to the homeless might eventually exist.

Notes

References

External links

Peluso, monumento al perro callejero (in Spanish) at Milagros Caninos Official Website.

2008 establishments in Mexico
2008 sculptures
Animal sculptures in Mexico
Bronze sculptures in Mexico
Dog monuments
Outdoor sculptures in Mexico City
Sculptures of dogs
Statues in Mexico City
Tlalpan
Vandalized works of art in Mexico